Scott Martin is an American politician from Pennsylvania currently serving as a Republican member of the Pennsylvania State Senate for the 13th district since January 3, 2017.  He previously served as a two-term Lancaster County Commissioner and chairman of the Pennsylvania Republican County Commissioners Caucus. Scott Martin is married to Amber Martin and they have four children. After a six month exploratory committee, on December 11, 2021, Martin announced his intention to seek the office of Governor of Pennsylvania.  Martin suspended his gubernatorial bid on February 11, 2022 due to complications from a broken leg and other injuries suffered in an accident, resulting in surgery.

Early life and education
Martin was born in Lancaster, Pennsylvania and graduated from Lancaster Catholic High School and Millersville University with a degree in Sociology/Criminal Justice.

He played professional football in the Arena Football League.

Political positions

Pediatric cancer 
Martin authored legislation which was later signed into law as Act 73 of 2017, which allows Pennsylvanians to voluntarily donate $5 to the Pediatric Cancer Research Fund when electronically renewing a driver's license, photo identification card or vehicle registration.

Martin has pushed for legislation that would allow Pennsylvania businesses to apply for tax credits if they make a donation to certain Pennsylvania medical centers for the purposes of pediatric cancer research/treatment. The total amount of tax credits cannot exceed $10 million in any one fiscal year and the program would last ten years.

Marijuana 
Martin is against the legalization of cannabis in Pennsylvania.

Charter schools 
As Education Committee chair, Martin introduced legislation opposed by school boards and teachers’ unions that seeks to make it easier to open charter schools and accelerate state taxpayer subsidies for private and parochial schools by hundreds of millions of dollars in the coming years. Also the bill says Charter schools would no longer be able to advertise themselves as “cost-free” or “free,” as they often do in marketing themselves now. Additionally, it would add transparency and accountability measures for charters to follow, as well as allow all secondary schools to offer dual-enrollment programs with colleges.

Committee assignments 

 Education, Chair 
 Appropriations
 Environmental Resources & Energy
 Judiciary

Electoral history

References

Arena Football League players
Living people
Millersville University of Pennsylvania alumni
Republican Party Pennsylvania state senators
Politicians from Lancaster, Pennsylvania
Year of birth missing (living people)
21st-century American politicians

Lancaster County Commissioners (Pennsylvania)